Cyperus gilesii, commonly known as Giles' flat-sedge, is a sedge of the Cyperaceae that is native to Australia.

Description
The annual or perennial sedge has a slender tufted habit. It has smooth trigonous or triquetrous shaped culms that are typically  in height with a diameter of  diameter.

There are one to three leaf-like involucral bracts.

Taxonomy
The species was first formally described by the botanist George Bentham in 1878 in the work Flora Australiensis.
The specific epithet honours the explorer William Ernest Powell Giles who led five major expeditions throughout central Australia.

Distribution
C. gilesii is found throughout Australia. It is common throughout Queensland, northern South Australia, northern New South Wales and eastern parts of the Northern Territory. In Western Australia it only occurs only rarely in the Pilbara region. It is often situated ephemerally wet situations, including inland stream and river banks, floodplains and roadside drains.

See also
List of Cyperus species
Plants using Giles names

References

Plants described in 1878
Flora of Western Australia
gilesii
Flora of Queensland
Flora of the Northern Territory
Flora of New South Wales
Taxa named by George Bentham